Sukhodol is a rural locality (a khutor) and the administrative center of Sukhodolskoye Rural Settlement, Sredneakhtubinsky District, Volgograd Oblast, Russia. The population was 1,334 as of 2010. There are 23 streets.

Geography 
Sukhodol is located 14 km southeast of Srednyaya Akhtuba (the district's administrative centre) by road. Shumrovaty is the nearest rural locality.

References 

Rural localities in Sredneakhtubinsky District